Robin McKeever (born April 8, 1973) is a Canadian Paralympic cross-country skier.

Biography
Born in Calgary, Alberta, McKeever participated in cross-country skiing at the 1998 Winter Olympics in Nagano.

McKeever is the sighted guide for his brother Brian McKeever, since 2001. The brothers raced together and won two gold and one silver at the 2002 Paralympic Winter Games in Salt Lake City. At the 2006 Games in Turin, he and his brother took two gold, one silver, and a bronze medal in cross-country skiing and biathlon.

He is the Para-Nordic ski coach for Cross Country Canada since November 2010.

Awards and honours
In 2011, McKeever was inducted into the Canadian Disability Hall of Fame alongside his brother Brian.

References

External links 
 

Robin McKeever profile at the Canadian Paralympic Committee
Robin McKeever (guide), Para-Nordic World Cup Team, Cross Country Canada
Paralympic Perspectives: Robin McKeever, Official website of Vancouver 2010, March 14, 2008

1973 births
Living people
Canadian male cross-country skiers
Cross-country skiers at the 1998 Winter Olympics
Paralympic sighted guides
Biathletes at the 2010 Winter Paralympics
Cross-country skiers at the 2010 Winter Paralympics
Paralympic gold medalists for Canada
Paralympic silver medalists for Canada
Paralympic bronze medalists for Canada
Canadian male biathletes
Canadian Disability Hall of Fame
Medalists at the 2002 Winter Paralympics
Medalists at the 2006 Winter Paralympics
Medalists at the 2010 Winter Paralympics
Paralympic medalists in cross-country skiing
Paralympic medalists in biathlon
Paralympic cross-country skiers of Canada
Paralympic biathletes of Canada